Woodland Fell is an upland area in the south of the English Lake District, south of Torver, Cumbria. It is the subject of a chapter of Wainwright's book The Outlying Fells of Lakeland. He describes the walk as: "a connoisseur's piece, every step an uninhibited joy, every corner a delight."

References

 

Fells of the Lake District